Cass Township is one of eleven townships in Clay County, Indiana. As of the 2010 census, its population was 347 and it contained 140 housing units.

History
Cass Township was organized in the 1840s. It was named for Lewis Cass.

The Indiana State Highway Bridge 42-11-3101 and Poland Presbyterian Church and Cemetery are listed on the National Register of Historic Places.

Geography

Unincorporated towns
 Hirt Corner
 Poland
(This list is based on USGS data and may include former settlements.)

Adjacent townships
 Washington Township, Putnam County (north)
 Jackson Township, Owen County (east)
 Washington Township (south)
 Jackson Township (west)

Major highways
  Indiana State Road 42

Cemeteries
The township contains 13 cemeteries: Cagle, Neir, Wilkinson-Nees, Poland Chapel, [Unnamed]. Anderson, Cromwell, Rizley, Old Mace, Dyer-Schopple, Syster, Union, & Latham-Lucas.

References
 
 United States Census Bureau cartographic boundary files

External links

Townships in Clay County, Indiana
Terre Haute metropolitan area
Townships in Indiana
Populated places established in the 1840s
1840s establishments in Indiana